United Nations Security Council Resolution 57 was adopted unanimously on September 18, 1948.

Shocked by the death of Count Folke Bernadotte, the United Nations Mediator in Palestine, the Council requested that the Secretary-General keep the flag of the United Nations at half-mast for three days, authorized him to meet from the Working Capital Fund all the expenses connected with the assassination of the United Nations Mediator and to be represented at the interment by the President of the person whom he may appoint for the occasion.

See also
List of United Nations Security Council Resolutions 1 to 100 (1946–1953)

References
Text of the Resolution at undocs.org

External links
 

 0057
 0057
 0057
September 1948 events